University Heights is a neighborhood in Newark in Essex County, New Jersey. It is so named because of the four academic institutions located within its boundaries: Rutgers University (Newark Campus), New Jersey Institute of Technology (NJIT), New Jersey Medical School (Rutgers) and Essex County College. In total, the schools enroll approximately 32,000 degree-seeking students.

The University Heights neighborhood is roughly bounded by University Avenue to the east, Orange Street to the north, Bergen Street to the west, and South Orange Avenue to the south. The schools are involved in the development of University Heights Science Park, a major research complex to be located between their campuses. The Public Health Research Institute on Warren Street relocated there in 2002. The area is home to Science Park High School as well. BioTrials, a French biological research company is one of the first firms to locate there. They are located in a seven story newly constructed building on Norfolk St.

Rutgers and NJIT were expanded considerably beginning in the 1960s.  Prior to this expansion, University Heights was a relatively affluent residential neighborhood of Newark. The area has one of Newark's few concentrations of brownstones. The gym at Essex County College was home of the American Basketball Association team, the Newark Express, which moved to Drew University and became the Jersey Express after averaging some 150 fans per game in Newark, though it attracted even fewer at Drew.  The area is home to the Paul Robeson Galleries at Rutgers University and the Weston Museum in the Van Houten Library at the New Jersey Institute of Technology, which includes artifacts from inventor Edward Weston, an early challenger of Thomas Edison.

One of the main north-south thoroughfares of University Heights is Martin Luther King, Jr. Blvd. (formerly High Street) home to many historic buildings. Eberhardt Hall at NJIT, St. Mary's Abbey Church, Essex County Hall of Records, and Essex County Veterans Courthouse are among Newark's registered historic places, as is the former Essex County Jail. The neighborhood is served by the Washington Street, Warren Street/NJIT, and Norfolk Street stations of Newark's Light Rail which links to Manhattan via the PATH and NJTransit rail systems at Newark's Penn Station.

History

Before the expansion of the universities in the 1960s, the area was modestly affluent and home to many brownstones (as evidenced by the nearby James Street Historic District Downtown). University Avenue was formerly known as Plane Street, as seen in the Washington Street Subway Station where signage directs riders to "Plane Street". High Street, one of the main streets, was renamed Dr. Martin Luther King Jr. Blvd in honor of the civil rights leader .

New development
After the civil unrest in 1967, the University Heights area fell into sharp decline (as with many neighboring areas in the city). Revitalization came through the expansion of all 4 universities/colleges in its boundaries; K. Hovnanian's Society Hill, a market-rate, 13 acre townhouse development just behind UMDNJ  and expansion of nearly all the high schools. Recently, the Essex County Parks Commission created and built Veterans Memorial Park on the former site of a parking garage, as part of a renovation of the adjacent county complex, which itself was upgraded with a new parking deck, streetscape improvements, walking paths and various building upgrades to the Hall of Records, Essex County Veterans Courthouse and former jail, creating a more curb appealing entrance to Downtown Newark.

Baxter Park, a mixed-use development started in July 2011 that will include 400 apartment units along with shopping and recreation space, will replace the 500 units in the original Baxter Terrace development, which was demolished starting in 2008. Bio-Trials, a French pharmaceutical research and development company constructed a modern eight story office and research facility on Norfolk St. in 2018.  The US Public Health Research Institute is located on Warren St. It was constructed several years ago. There are a host of other projects planned or under construction.

Education

Colleges and universities 

New Jersey Institute of Technology
Rutgers–Newark
Rutgers Biomedical and Health Sciences (Formerly University of Medicine and Dentistry of New Jersey)
Essex County College

High schools 

The neighborhood is also home to many high schools (public and private) including:

Public 
Central High School (moved south to a new campus in the Springfield/Belmont neighborhood)
Newark Arts High School
Newark Tech High School
Science Park High School (Built in 2006)

Private 
Saint Benedict's Preparatory School, all-boys prep school 
Saint Vincent Academy, all-girls prep school
St. Patricks School

See also
Council for Higher Education in Newark

References

External links
 NJIT campus gateway redevelopment plan map

Neighborhoods in Newark, New Jersey
Academic enclaves
Populated places in Essex County, New Jersey